Brandsta City Släckers is a Swedish band with some firefighters that became very popular in Sweden.

The band sang "Kom och ta mig" in Melodifestivalen 2002 and they also performed in Melodifestivalen 2003 with "15 minuter". 
The groupmembers usually work as firefighters and perform dressed as such. They also received the third highest vote from the televoting audience in Melodifestivalen 2002.

Leadsinger Glenn Borgkvist has also done a duet with Lotta Nilsson in Melodifestivalen 2004, and hosted the rescue show "På liv och död" on TV4.

External links
/ Glenn borgkvist in På liv och död, Tv4.se
BCS homepage, English
Official homepage BCS
Article from Melodifestivalen 2002*[ BCS hit from Melodifestivalen, hitparad.se]

Swedish male musicians
Melodifestivalen contestants of 2003
Melodifestivalen contestants of 2002